Tumba Church is a church building in Tumba, Botkyrka, Sweden.

See also 
 Tullinge Church

Churches in Stockholm